Before I Fall is a 2010 young adult novel written by the American author Lauren Oliver. The novel is written in the first-person perspective of a teenage girl, Samantha Kingston, who is forced to relive the day of her death every day for a week. In an effort to understand why that happens to her, Samantha undertakes new actions each day, some of which are out of character and surprise her family and friends.

The book is the basis for the film of the same name that was released on March 3, 2017.

Plot
The story begins on a seemingly normal day for the popular 17-year-old Samantha "Sam" Kingston. On February 12, known as "Cupid's Day," Sam goes about her day as normal with her three best childhood friends: Elody, Lindsay, and Ally. That night, Sam attends the party of Kent McFuller, an unpopular boy at their high school who used to be her best friend, but Sam now treats him badly despite them both knowing he has romantic feelings for her. Sam was supposed to have sex that night with her boyfriend, Rob, but he is too drunk. Juliet Sykes, a girl bullied by Sam and her best friends since elementary school, attends the party and calls Sam and her friends "Bitches." Sam's friends react to the accusation by pouring alcoholic beverages on Juliet, calling her names, and shoving her. Juliet runs out of the house.

Later that night, Sam and her best friends drive home. At 12:39 AM is a sudden "flash of white." The vehicle veers off the road and crashes into a tree. Sam is killed instantaneously.

The "next morning," Sam wakes up, and later, her sister comes to tell her to get ready for school, because she is going to be late. Sam tells her sister its Saturday, but then is confused to find that it is still February 12 on her clock - and that the day has magically restarted. She goes through the day in a confused fog and watches as the same events repeat themselves. However, that night, upon driving home, Sam warns Lindsay, who is driving, to be careful. Lindsay shrugs her off, and Sam watches nervously as the car's clock turns to 12:39. They crash, and she dies just like the previous day. 

Again, Sam wakes up on February 12. But, this time, she feigns an illness and shows up to school late. Now that Sam realizes that she is reliving the same day, she does a lot of things differently and can find out things about various acquaintances and peers. That night, Sam convinces her friends to ditch Kent's party and to have a sleepover instead. The girls wake up in the middle of the night to the news that Juliet has killed herself. Upon showing up at the party and realizing Sam and her best friends were not there, Juliet returned home and died by a self-inflicted gunshot wound.

Elody and Ally worry aloud that it was partially their fault. Lindsay, who has led the bullying efforts toward Juliet for years, shuts them down by being indifferent towards what happened. Elody and Ally, disgusted with Lindsey, leave the basement to sleep upstairs. Sam goes through Lindsay's things and finds that she and Juliet were best friends when they were little, but the girlhood friendship abruptly ended in fifth grade, right before Lindsay started bullying and harassing Juliet.

The next day, the fourth February 12 that she experiences, Sam is extremely angry about what happened the previous day. She dresses in a skimpy outfit with the word "slut" written on it, gets into a fight with her parents before school, and insults all of her friends, which effectively ends their friendship and enrages Lindsay to the point that she forces Sam out of the car and leaves her to walk to school. In calculus class, Sam brazenly flirts with her perverted math teacher, Mr. Daimler. After he dismisses the class, they make out, which does not feel how Sam expected it to feel. Instead, she feels uncomfortable and disgusted. As she has dumped her friends and has no one to eat lunch with, Sam flees to an abandoned bathroom and finds Anna Cartullo, another one of Lindsay's (and therefore Sam's) victims. The girls have a surprisingly transparent discussion about why Sam and her friends have bullied Anna. In a gesture of solidarity, they end up trading footwear, Sam's extremely high heels, and Anna's comfortable combat boots, for the remainder of the day. As Anna leaves the bathroom to hang out with a boy, Alex, who is cheating on his girlfriend with Anna, Sam tells Anna that she is too good for Alex.

When Juliet enters the party that night, Sam is desperate for a distraction and so leads a drunk Rob over to an empty bedroom with the intention of having sex. However, when they are both half-naked, Rob falls asleep because he is too intoxicated. Sam quickly puts her clothes back on, stumbles into a barred-off section of Kent’s house, and sobs. It turns out that Kent was standing there the whole time, and he comforts Sam and puts her to bed. Sam now realizes that she is romantically attracted to Kent, but she drifts to sleep and the day resets. 

Sam wakes up in her own room on the fifth morning of February 12 and makes a list of all the things in her life she wants but will probably be unable to do. She ditches school to spend the day at home with her 8-year-old sister, Izzy, and bonds with her. That night, she goes out to dinner with her family and meets Juliet's younger sister, Marian. Sam has a short conversation with Marian and begs her to tell Juliet "not to do it." Marian says that she will tell Juliet tomorrow. Defeated by the word "tomorrow" and understanding there will never be a tomorrow, Sam goes back to her table. 

Later that night, she sneaks out of the house to go to Kent's party but stops at Juliet's house on the way. She meets her mother and realizes that her father is indeed an alcoholic and that the family struggles with some deep issues. Desperate to get out of the house, Sam leaves to go to Kent's party. Juliet has already shown up and been pushed around by Sam's friends. Juliet runs into the woods, where Sam chases after her and finds her standing by the highway. She tries to talk to Juliet, but Juliet feels past the point of saving and runs out into the road.

Juliet is struck and killed by the car that Lindsay is driving. Elody and Ally are passengers in the vehicle. The car veers off the road and into a tree. Ally and Lindsay are unhurt, but Elody, who is sitting in the front passenger seat, where Sam would have otherwise occupied, is killed. Sam finally realizes that the "flash of white" she saw that night was actually Juliet running out in front of Lindsay's car to end the mental pain that Lindsay had caused her many years ago.

Kent speaks with the police, takes care of the situation, escorts Sam back to the house, helps her warm up, puts her into dry clothes, and then puts her to bed. Before Sam falls asleep, she asks him why he is being so nice to her. He replies that when they were little, Sam defended him from a bully when he was crying because his grandfather had died. She feels his lips on hers, but she drops off to sleep, and the day is lost.

The next day, Sam is happier than the previous days. However, in an effort to be a better person, she ends up accidentally wronging some rights. As it is still "Cupid's Day," Sam sends dozens of flowers to Juliet from "her secret admirer," who interprets it as a taunt, rather than a compliment. Sam then enacts revenge on certain people in vindictive ways, such as embarrassing Rob at Kent's party and revealing to Alex's girlfriend that he's cheating on her, which enrages both of them. She has a long talk with Juliet in the bathroom before Juliet confronts Lindsay, Ally, and Elody. However, Sam fails to get through to Juliet, who escapes into the woods. Sam chases after her and manages to save her from an oncoming truck. Sam tries to talk Juliet out of committing suicide, but Juliet again runs into oncoming traffic for a second time and kills herself. 

Sam drives Lindsay home after Juliet's death, and after she drops Lindsay off, she talks with her about Juliet. Lindsay seems defeated, and Sam realizes that she is far less fearless than she portrays herself to be.

Kent gives Sam a ride home, and they kiss before they arrive at her home. It feels right to Sam, much more right than it felt with Rob, who Sam now finds gross. Sam goes inside and falls asleep. The day resets again. 

On the seventh and last day, Sam wakes up and does everything right. She tells her family that she loves them and gives her grandmother's necklace to her sister Izzy. Sam compliments her friends, sends a single rose to both Juliet and Kent, and walks in on Alex and Anna's date to give Anna an art book that she knows Anna will like. Sam arrives early to the class that Mr. Daimler teaches and calls him out for being a pervert before her classmates arrive.

Sam breaks up with Rob, who gets extremely angry because he had always shrugged her off as not being cool enough for him although there was never an actual attraction on either side. She now knows that she is disgusted by him and does not like him. When it is time for the party, Sam makes sure that Lindsay does not drive herself since she is aware that Lindsay is a bad driver who often drives under the influence of alcohol. Sam gets picked up by Kent, and they make out in the car when they get to his house, but she accidentally lets slip that she "doesn't have much time." Aware that something is going on, he tries to stop her, but she leaves for the party.

She tries to stop Juliet from killing herself again but is unable to convince Juliet in the limited time she has. When Juliet runs onto the highway, Sam pushes her out of the way and is struck by a van instead. 

Sam lies on the ground and is barely conscious and dying. Above her is Juliet, who cradles her head, saying, "You saved me. Why did you save me?" A fatally hurt and weakened Sam thinks, "No. You saved me."

Film adaptation

Fox 2000 optioned the rights for Before I Fall in mid-2010, with Maria Maggenti named as the writer, and Jon Shestack named as a producer soon after. Ry Russo-Young was hired to direct. In 2015, Awesomness TV came on board to the produce the film. In September 2015, it was announced that Zoey Deutch had been cast as the lead. In October, Halston Sage was cast, along with actor Logan Miller and YouTube star Kian Lawley. Later that same month, Scream Queens star Diego Boneta and actress Elena Kampouris were also announced as part of the cast.

The film had its world premiere at the Sundance Film Festival on January 21, 2017, and was theatrically released on March 3, 2017, by Open Road Films.

Reception
Reviews for Before I Fall have been positive, with RT Book Reviews giving the book 4 1/2 stars and nominating it for their 2010 "Best Young Adult Paranormal/Fantasy Novel". Kirkus Reviews described the novel as "unexpectedly rich". The School Library Journal wrote that although the book was "somewhat predictable, the plot drives forward and teens will want to see where Sam's choices lead".

See also
 Time loops
 Butterfly effect
 Groundhog Day (film)
 Russian Doll (TV series)
 Palm Springs (2020 film)

References

External links
Official author page
Book Trailer
Official Blog

 American young adult novels
2010 American novels
 Debut fantasy novels
 American novels adapted into films
Time loop novels
Fiction about sacrifices
 Novels set in Connecticut
2010 debut novels
First-person narrative novels
HarperCollins books